Rio Americano High School, colloquially known as Rio, is a public high school in Arden-Arcade, California, just outside Sacramento, serving students in grades 9 through 12 as part of the San Juan Unified School District. Rio Americano students come from the surrounding areas of Arden Park, Arden Oaks, Sierra Oaks, Fair Oaks, Carmichael, Gold River, and to a much lesser extent, the La Sierra community.  In recent years, more students have been transferring from other districts and areas, partly due to the shift of Sacramento High School to a charter school.  Rio's two rival schools are Jesuit High School and El Camino Fundamental High School because of the schools' close proximity.

As of the 2019–20 school year, the school had an enrollment of 1,953 students. Cliff Kelly is the principal. Christopher Hauger, Jennifer Dalton and Robert Kerr are the vice principals.

Awards and recognition

During the 1994–96 and 2006–07 school years, Rio Americano High School was recognized with the Blue Ribbon School Award of Excellence by the United States Department of Education, the highest award an American school can receive.

In 2008 Newsweek ranked Rio as number 595 on their list of the top 1,300 public schools in the United States.

In 2013, Rio Americano held an Academic Performance Index (API) of 823.

Rio Americano produces a handful of National Merit commended students and a few National Merit semifinalists each year. Rio students also perform well on Advanced Placement (AP) exams, with over 400 AP exam scores of 3 or better and over 100 AP exam scores of 5 (the highest score possible) in 2009.

Demographics

Extracurricular activities

Mock Trial

Mock Trial is a year-round program that places students in a courtroom environment in which they act the parts of attorneys, witnesses, court clerks and bailiffs, in order to better their knowledge in the field of law. Each year the Team participates in competitions organized through the Constitutional Rights Foundations. Rio Americano's Mock Trial Team is known for its continuous record of success at both the County and State level Competitions.  The Team has won 13 Sacramento County Championships: 1980, 1982, 1994, 1997, 1999, 2000, 2002, 2003, 2004, 2006, 2008, 2010, 2012, and 2021. From 1979-202, the coach of Rio's Mock Trial Team is local attorney James "Jay" R. Greiner. In 2017, the team placed 3rd in the Sacramento County competition. In 2018, the team placed 2nd in the Sacramento County competition. In 2021 the team won the Sacramento County competition.

Science Bowl

Science Bowl is an academic competition sponsored by the United States Department of Energy that tests students in various categories of Science including Biology, Chemistry, Physics, Space Science, Earth Science, Energy, and Mathematics. Rio won the Sacramento Regional Competition in 1992 and competed in the national tournament in Washington, DC.

Notable alumni
 Barbi Benton (1968) - Former Playboy Playmate and girlfriend of Hugh Hefner
 John Bowker (2001) - outfielder for the Pittsburgh Pirates
 Channing Dungey (1986) - American television executive and producer, First African-American to serve as president of ABC Entertainment Group.
 John Daversa - jazz trumpet player and three-time Grammy Award Winner in 2019.
 Merrin Dungey (1989) - actress
 Patty Fendick (1983) - professional tennis player
 Mike Flanagan (1991) - former center for the Houston Texans and the Green Bay Packers
 John Ferris (1967) - member of the 1968 Summer Olympics United States Swimming Team.
Ted Gaines - California State Senator, former state assemblyman
 Alex Heartman (2008)- Actor most notably as the Red Ranger in Power Rangers Samurai
 Jason Kamras (1991) - National Teacher of the Year, 2005
 Jonathan Karsh (1990) - independent film and television producer
 Goodwin Liu (1987) - Supreme Court of California Associate Justice and former UC Berkeley Law Professor
 Linsey Marr (1992) - Environmental Engineering professor at Virginia Tech whose expertise on aerosols and virus transmission made her a frequently cited authority who appeared in major media news programs and columns during the COVID-19 pandemic.
 Trevor Matich (1979) - 12-year NFL lineman.
 Debbie Meyer (1970) - three-time Olympic gold medalist swimmer at the 1968 Summer Olympics.
 Amobi Okugo (2009) - Major League Soccer player
 Doug Ose (1973) - Former Congressman who represented  from 1998 to 2004.
 Chad Overhauser (1993) - American football player
 Susan Pedersen (1971) - four-time Olympic medalist  at the 1968 Summer Olympics
 Johnny Rabb (1990) - Professional Touring Drummer.  Also plays in a duo named BioDiesel.
 Charles M. Rice (1970) -  Nobel Prize
 Christopher Rufo (2002) - Conservative activist and opponent of so-called critical race theory
 Christoforos Schuff (1997) - priest and musician, best known for humanitarian work and social activism, now known as Christine Harstad Schuff.
 Jane Sibbett (1980) - actress best known for playing Carol Willick on Friends
 David Sirlin - video game designer, fighting games player, and writer
 Adrian Tomine - Cartoonist
 Drake U'u (2008)- Professional basketball player
 W. Craig Vanderwagen, MD (1967) Former Assistant Secretary for Preparedness and Response, US Department of Health and Human Services
 Sasha Victorine (1996) - midfielder for Chivas USA of Major League Soccer
 James Leighman Williams (2003) - Olympic Silver Medalist - Fencing

References

External links
 Official website
 Rio Americano Band Website
 The Mirada (Rio Americano's newspaper)

Educational institutions established in 1963
High schools in Sacramento, California
Public high schools in California
1963 establishments in California
High schools in Sacramento County, California